Prolom or Prolom Banja is a spa located in the municipality of Kuršumlija, southern Serbia. It lies below the slopes of the wooded mountains of Radan and Sokolovica, at the altitude between 550 and 670 meters. As of 2011 census, it has a population of 131 inhabitants.

Features

It has several springs, of temperatures between 26 and 31,5 °C. "Prolom water" (Prolom voda) is a low-mineral water, said to have high curative characteristics, and it is bottled and sold worldwide. There is hotel "Radan" with 212 rooms, medical and wellness center.

See also
 List of spa towns in Serbia

References

External links

 

Populated places in Toplica District
Spa towns in Serbia